Grown Man Talk is a 2003 mixtape from Hip Hop artist Diamond D, released through Diamond's own Diamond Mine imprint. The album was not distributed nationwide, and only a limited number of copies were printed. Grown Man Talk featured production from Diamond and 88 Keys, as well as appearances from Brand Nubian's Sadat X.

Track listing
All tracks produced by Diamond D, except track 10 produced by 88 Keys

References

2003 albums
Diamond D albums
Albums produced by Diamond D